"Put Some Drive in Your Country" is a song written and recorded by American country music artist Travis Tritt. It was released in September 1990 as the fourth single from his debut album Country Club.

Content
The song is an up-tempo country rock song in which Tritt proclaims his influences, paying homage to Roy Acuff, George Jones, Hank Williams Jr. and Waylon Jennings as well. In the song, Tritt defines his style singing "I made myself a promise, when I was just a kid: I'd mix Southern rock and country, and that's just what I did".

Critical reception
Stephen Thomas Erlewine by Allmusic said that "[the song], which had a clear rock & roll influence, stalled at #28, since radio programmers were reluctant to feature such blatantly rock-derived music".

Personnel
The following musicians play on this track:
Mike Brignardello – bass guitar
Larry Byrom – slide guitar
Dana McVicker – background vocals
Bobby Ogdin – piano, keyboards
Jim "Jimmy Joe" Ruggiere – harmonica 
Steve Turner – drums, percussion
Billy Joe Walker Jr. – electric guitar
Reggie Young – electric guitar

Chart performance

References

1990 singles
Travis Tritt songs
Songs written by Travis Tritt
Warner Records singles
1990 songs